Sweet Kitty Bellairs is a 1916 American silent romantic comedy film based on the 1900 novel The Bath Comedy, by Agnes and Egerton Castle. The novel was first adapted for the stage in 1903 by David Belasco which was a huge Broadway success for lead actress Henrietta Crosman. The film version stars Mae Murray and was directed by James Young.

Cast 
Mae Murray as Kitty Bellairs
Tom Forman as Lord Verney
Belle Bennett as Lady Julia
Lucille Young as Lady Barbara Flyte
Joseph King as Sir Jasper
James Neill as Colonel Villers
Lucille Lavarney as Lady Maria
Horace B. Carpenter as Captain Spicer
Robert Gray as Captain O'Hara
Loretta Young (uncredited)

Other adaptations 
Sweet Kitty Bellairs was remade again in 1930 as a sound musical comedy filmed in Technicolor.

See also 
List of lost films

References

External links 
 
 
 Sweet Kitty Bellairs at silentera.com

1916 films
1910s romantic comedy films
American silent feature films
American romantic comedy films
Lost American films
American historical romance films
American black-and-white films
Famous Players-Lasky films
Films based on British novels
American films based on plays
Films directed by James Young
Films set in the 1730s
Films set in England
Paramount Pictures films
Films based on multiple works
1910s historical comedy films
American historical comedy films
1916 lost films
1910s historical romance films
Lost romantic comedy films
1916 comedy films
1910s American films
Silent romantic comedy films
Silent American comedy films
Silent historical comedy films
Silent historical romance films